Ferrocarriles Argentinos Sociedad del Estado, trading as Trenes Argentinos, is a state-owned railway company of Argentina created for the operation and maintenance of the Argentine railway network in the country, including passenger and freight services, and infrastructure.

The company is divided into four divisions: Trenes Argentinos Operaciones (passenger services), Trenes Argentinos Cargas (freight), Trenes Argentinos Infraestructura (infrastructure), and Trenes Argentinos Capital Humano (human resources).

In March 2021, Minister of Transport announced that Ferrocarriles Argentinos S.E. would be put operative again, after an almost 5-year hiatus during the presidency of Mauricio Macri.

As of May 2022, Trenes Argentinos had 30,102 employees, ranking 1st as the Argentine company with most employees.

History 

The project to nationalise all the Argentine railway network had been announced by President Cristina Fernández de Kirchner during her speech at the Congress of Argentina's 133rd-year inaugural session on 1 March 2015.

At the time the project was sent to the Congress to be discussed, only Belgrano Norte and Urquiza lines (operated by Ferrovías and Metrovías respectively) were under private concessions for passenger services, while Nuevo Central Argentino (NCA), Ferroexpreso Pampeano and Ferrosur companies operated freight trains.

On 15 April 2015, the Congress of Argentina adopted the creation of "Ferrocarriles Argentinos Sociedad del Estado", with 53 votes in favour and 2 votes against. Therefore, the Government of Argentina will take over the operation and maintenance of all the railway lines after they had granted to private companies during Carlos Menem's administration in the early 1990s. The re-nationalisation law was officially promulgated on May 20, 2015.

It was also announced that private companies still operating services at the time the law was promulgated, Nuevo Central Argentino, Ferroexpreso Pampeano, Ferrosur Roca, Metrovías and Ferrovías will continue their activities although Ferrocarriles Argentinos S.E. will be able to renegotiate or even cancel the contracts of concession.

As part of a plan of rail transport modernisation announced by the Ministry of Transport led by Mario Meoni, on March 8, 2021, "Ferrocarriles Argentinos S.E." was relaunched, setting its new offices at Constitución railway station. FASE had been inactive during the government of Mauricio Macri, when its divisions operated independently. The relaunch included a new logo, inspired on the homonymous company dissolved in 1993.

The company shared its original name with the previous national operator which was broken up during the privatisation process, and also uses a modified version of its original logo.

Organizational structure 

By 2015, the board of directors had six members: a representative of the Secretary of Transport, the presidents of ADIF, SOFSE and Belgrano CyL and other two representatives appointed by the Ministry of Transport according to proposals sent by several railway unions registered.

The company also plans, operates and controls all the railway system in Argentina, both passenger and freight services. The railway system is managed under a model of "open access" where several private operators are able to serve freight services along the lines.

Divisions 
Four divisions operate under the supervision of FASE, as it was announced in March 2021:
 Trenes Argentinos Operaciones – passenger services
 Trenes Argentinos Cargas – freight services
 Trenes Argentinos Infraestructura (ADIFSE) – infrastructure
 Trenes Argentinos Capital Humano - Human resources

See also 
 Ferrocarriles Argentinos – predecessor company, operated from 1949 to 1993
 Rail transport in Argentina

References

External links 

 

Railway companies of Argentina
Railway companies established in 2015
Argentine companies established in 2015
Government-owned railway companies